State Road 399 (SR 399) is a state road in Santa Rosa County, Florida. Although it only extends  from U.S. Route 98 (US 98) to the Bob Sikes Bridge, County Road 399 (CR 399) continues over the bridge, along Santa Rosa Island, and back to US 98 via the Navarre Bridge. Other segments of CR 399 also exist on the mainland.

Route description

Beginning at a trumpet interchange with US 98–SR 30 in Gulf Breeze, SR 399 heads south to the end of state maintenance at the gore of the interchange. CR 399 continues south over the Bob Sikes Bridge, which crosses Santa Rosa Sound from the mainland to Santa Rosa Island. It then curves east at Pensacola Beach and heads east along the barrier island through the Gulf Islands National Seashore to Navarre Beach, where CR 399 turns north and crosses the Navarre Bridge back to the mainland. The Navarre Bridge was a toll bridge with one cash and one SunPass lane for southbound traffic until 2005 but it is now toll-free.

Major intersections

References

External links

399
399
State highways in the United States shorter than one mile